The Choice may refer to:

Books
 The Choice (novel), a novel by Nicholas Sparks
 The Choice, 1984 novel by Og Mandino
 The Choice, a non-fiction book about Bill Clinton's 1996 presidential campaign by Bob Woodward
 The Choice (Goldratt book), a book by Eliyahu M. Goldratt and Efrat Goldratt-Ashlag
 The Choice, a 1993 book by Muslim preacher Ahmed Deedat

Film and television
 The Choice (TV series), a 2012 dating game show on Fox
 The Choice (Le Choix), a 1975 film by Jacques Faber starring Claude Jade in a dual role
 Yam Daabo, released in English as The Choice, a 1986 film by Idrissa Ouedraogo
 The Choice (2015 film), an Italian film directed by Michele Placido
 The Choice (2016 film), a film adaptation of the Nicholas Sparks novel
 The Choice (1970 film), by Youssef Chahine
 "The Choice" (Dynasty May 1986), an episode of Dynasty
 "The Choice" (Dynasty November 1986), an episode of Dynasty
 "The Choice" (Farscape episode), an episode of Farscape
 "The Choice" (The Outer Limits), an episode of The Outer Limits
 "The Choice" (Homeland), an episode of Homeland
 "The Choice" (House), an episode of the American TV series House
 The Choice (radio series), an interview series on BBC Radio 4 presented by Michael Buerk

Music
 "The Choice", a 1990 song by Neurosis from The Word as Law
 "The Choice", a track from the soundtrack of the 2015 video game Undertale by Toby Fox

Other
 The Choice (play), a 1764 play by Arthur Murphy
 The Choice (painting), a 1909 watercolor painting by Frances MacDonald (available on Wikimedia Commons)
 KTSU, a college radio station branded as "The Choice"

See also
Choice (disambiguation)